Donald Mukahatesho is a Zambian judoka. He competed in the men's middleweight event at the 1980 Summer Olympics. He placed 9th overall.

References

External links
 

Year of birth missing (living people)
Living people
Zambian male judoka
Olympic judoka of Zambia
Judoka at the 1980 Summer Olympics
Place of birth missing (living people)